Jeannine Richard is a Canadian politician. She was a member of the National Assembly of Quebec for the riding of Îles-de-la-Madeleine, first elected in the 2012 election.  She was defeated in the 2014 election.

References

Living people
Parti Québécois MNAs
Women MNAs in Quebec
People from Gaspésie–Îles-de-la-Madeleine
21st-century Canadian politicians
21st-century Canadian women politicians
Year of birth missing (living people)